Disconeura linaza is a moth of the family Erebidae first described by Paul Dognin in 1898. It is found in Paraguay.

References

Phaegopterina
Moths described in 1898